The 2013 AFC U-22 Championship qualification was the qualification tournament for the inaugural edition of the AFC U-22 Asian Cup. The qualifiers took place from 23 June to 3 July 2012, but were later changed to 2–10 June for Group D, due to Nepal's request. The matches were later rescheduled to start from 16 June and 3 July for Indonesia.

Player eligibility 
Players born before 1 January 1991 are not eligible to compete in the 2013 AFC U-22 Asian Cup qualification tournament.

Format 
Forty-one member associations entered the qualification to grab 15 spots in the final tournament The qualifiers were to be held in seven centralized venues.

The teams were divided into six groups of six teams each and one group of five. They played in a single round-robin format and the top two teams qualifying for the tournament proper along with the best third-placed team from all the groups. The hosts of the Finals got a direct berth.

With the AFC Competitions Committee awarding the hosting rights of the 2013 Finals to Oman on 18 July 2012 and with Oman being the best third placed side, this enabled the 2nd best third placed team, Yemen, to enter the finals.

Tiebreakers 
If two or more teams are equal on points on completion of the group matches, the following criteria were applied to determine the rankings.
 Greater number of points obtained in the group matches between the teams concerned;
 Goal difference resulting from the group matches between the teams concerned;
 Greater number of goals scored in the group matches between the teams concerned;
 Goal difference in all the group matches;
 Greater number of goals scored in all the group matches;
 Kicks from the penalty mark if only two teams are involved and they are both on the field of play;
 Fewer score calculated according to the number of yellow and red cards received in the group matches;
 Drawing of lots.

Teams 
The countries which are qualified for the final tournament are emboldened.

 
 
 
 
 
 
 
 
 
 
 
 
 
 
 
 
 
 
 
 
 
 
 
 
 
 
 
 
 
 
 
 
 
 
 
 
 
 
 
 
 

 Did not enter:

Group stage

West Asia

Group A 
 All matches were played in Muscat, Oman.
 Times listed are UTC+4.

Group B 
 All matches were played in Riyadh, Saudi Arabia.
 Times listed are UTC+3.

Group C 
 All matches were played in Malacca, Malaysia.
 Times listed are UTC+8.

Group D 
 All matches were played in Kathmandu, Nepal.
 Times listed are UTC+5:45.

East Asia

Group E 
 All matches were played in Pekanbaru, Indonesia.
 Times listed are UTC+7.

Group F 
 All matches were played in Vientiane, Laos.
 Times listed are UTC+7.

Group G 
 All matches were played in Yangon, Myanmar.
 Times listed are UTC+6:30.

Third placed teams 
 Due to Group D only having five teams in their group, results against teams finishing last in the 6-team groups will not be counted.

Goalscorers

References

External links 
 AFC U-22 Championship, the-AFC.com

Qualification
U-22 Championship qualification
2012 in Burmese sport
2013 in Indonesian football
2012 in Laotian football
2012 in Malaysian football
2012 in Nepalese sport
2012–13 in Omani football
2012–13 in Saudi Arabian football
2013
2012 in Burmese football